Guy Carol Dugdale (9 April 1905 – 4 September 1982) was a British bobsledder who competed in the late 1930s. He won the bronze medal in the four-man event at the 1936 Winter Olympics in Garmisch-Partenkirchen, Germany.

Personal life
Dugdale served in the Wiltshire Regiment during the Second World War.

References

External links
Bobsleigh four-man Olympic medalists for 1924, 1932-56, and since 1964
British Olympic Association profile
DatabaseOlympics.com profile
Guy Dugdale's profile at Sports Reference.com

1905 births
1982 deaths
Bobsledders at the 1936 Winter Olympics
British male bobsledders
Olympic medalists in bobsleigh
Medalists at the 1936 Winter Olympics
Olympic bronze medallists for Great Britain
British Army personnel of World War II
Wiltshire Regiment soldiers